Thomas (or Tom) Buchanan is the name of:
Thomas Buchanan (moderator) (d.1599) Moderator of the General Assembly of the Church of Scotland in 1588
Thomas Buchanan (Liberal politician) (1846–1911), Scottish Liberal politician, Under-Secretary of State for India 
Thomas Buchanan (Unionist politician) (born 1963), Northern Ireland politician
Thomas Buchanan (Governor of Liberia) (1808–1841), first governor of Liberia and cousin of James Buchanan, president of the United States
 Thomas Boughton Buchanan (1833–1924), Archdeacon of Wilts from 1874 until 1911
Thomas Buchanan Read (1822–1872), American poet and painter
Tom Buchanan (born 1960), British historian
Tom Buchanan, a fictional character in The Great Gatsby
Tom Buchanan, a contestant on Survivor (American TV series)